State Highway 88 is a state highway connecting Mysore and Bantwal in the South Indian state of Karnataka. It connects Mysore with the hill station of Madikeri and the port city of Mangalore. The road is also used as an alternate route to connect Mysore to Northern Kerala via Hunsur, Gonikoppa and Kutta. In 2010, the Karnataka Police deployed police vehicles to ensure safety on the highway. The road is maintained by the Karnataka Road Development Corporation Limited.

2013 damage 
In August 2013, Kodagu district administration had closed down the road after water seepage from incessant rainfall had caused huge cracks to develop on the road.

See also 
 List of state highways in Karnataka
 National Highway 48 (India)

References 

State Highways in Karnataka
Roads in Mysore district
Roads in Dakshina Kannada district
Roads in Kodagu district